Peenetal/Loitz is an Amt in the Vorpommern-Greifswald district, in Mecklenburg-Vorpommern, Germany. The seat of the Amt is in Loitz.

The Amt Peenetal/Loitz consists of the following municipalities:
Görmin
Loitz
Sassen-Trantow

References

Ämter in Mecklenburg-Western Pomerania